Chesterton is a small village in Warwickshire, England. The population of the civil parish taken at the 2011 census was 123.  It is about five miles south of Leamington Spa, near the villages of Harbury and Lighthorne.

Parish
The parish of Chesterton and Kingston includes the agricultural area of Kingston east of the village. The parish forms a roughly rectangular block, nearly four miles in length from north-west to south-east and two miles broad. It is home to the notable Chesterton Windmill, built in 1632 from a design attributed to Inigo Jones, just off the Fosse Way and a Grade I listed building. The altitude of the parish ranges from 64 metres in the west to 122 metres in the east being mainly rolling low hills but slightly flatter where the Fosse Way dissects it.

History

There was a Roman town on the Fosse Way less than a mile from the present village of Chesterton and this was mentioned in the Domesday Book of 1086. The village changed names many times being Cestreyon (1043), Cestedone (1086), Cestertona (1170), Templer Cestreton (1185), Chastreton (1198), Casterton (1292) and Chesterton by 1350. Humble Bee cottages, on the hill where the manor ruins are, are now abandoned, but are thought to have been owned by the ancestors of Lord Willoughby de Broke (John Verney), who was descended from the owners of the manor. Originally, three terraced cottages existed, being rented by farm workers, but the cottage on the far right has been demolished. Actress Sophie Turner spent her childhood in the village.

The parish church dedicated to St. Giles, is thought to date back to the 12th century, the most recent update being in 1862. Parish records held at Warwick Records Office date back to 1538. At one time the church served the settlement of Chesterton. This settlement disappeared as a result of the inhabitants moving away to Chesterton Green, after receiving a visit from that most unwelcome of itinerants, the plague. Local rumour has it that tunnels connect the church to nearby Humble Bee cottages. In 1642 the Parish was merged with the neighbouring one of Kingston, to be renamed Chesterton and Kingston.

Since the 1350s much of the village had been in the possession of the Peyto family who lived at Chesterton House. Chesterton House was demolished in 1802 after Margaret Peyto, last of the family, died in 1772 and left her estates to her cousin John Verney of nearby Compton Verney. The remains of the walls and gateway still stand. As well as being involved in the building of the windmill Sir Edward Peyto probably built the nearby watermill which started off as a court house but was converted to a mill in 1634. The stream supplying the mill pond created flooding problems so now no longer tops it up. In the 1960s an attempt to clear the pool failed, killing all the fish and making it stagnant. It was many years before the pool recovered and now has maximum dimensions of 315 by 105 metres.

Population
The population at various stages in time were:

1293: 29 Free Tenants
1299: 20 households
1509: 8 households
1901: 142
1921: 182
1931: 287
2001: 123
2011: 123

Gallery

References

External links 

Photos of Chesterton and surrounding area on geograph.org.uk

Villages in Warwickshire
Roman towns and cities in England
Stratford-on-Avon District